In mathematics and physics, covariance is a measure of how much two variables change together, and may refer to:

Statistics
 Covariance matrix, a matrix of covariances between a number of variables
 Covariance or cross-covariance between two random variables or data sets
 Autocovariance, the covariance of a signal with a time-shifted version of itself
 Covariance function, a function giving the covariance of a random field with itself at two locations

Algebra and geometry
 Covariance and contravariance of vectors, properties of how vector coordinates change under a change of basis
 Covariant transformation, a rule that describes how certain physical entities change under a change of coordinate system
 Covariance and contravariance of functors, properties of functors
 General covariance or simply covariance (inaccurate but common usage in quantum mechanics), the invariance of the mathematical form of physical laws under arbitrary differential coordinate transformations (including Lorentz transformations), strictly meaning invariance
 Lorentz covariance, a property of space-time that follows from the special theory of relativity
 Poincaré covariance, a related property
 Eddy covariance, an atmospheric flux measurement technique
 in category theory, covariant functor, the same as a functor (the term is used to be in contrast to the term contravariant functor).

Computer science
 Covariance and contravariance (computer science), a system of class relations in computer science

See also
 Covariance and correlation
 Covariance and contravariance (disambiguation)